David Mitchell (born 4 April 1990) is a Scottish footballer who plays as a goalkeeper for Partick Thistle. Mitchell has previously played for Ayr United, Stranraer, Dundee, Falkirk, Clyde and Hibernian.

Career
Mitchell began his career at Ayr United, but having not featured in the first team he joined Stranraer on loan in July 2009, then made the move permanent in June 2010. He stated that his decision to make the initial loan move was to achieve his ambition of first team football which he felt he wouldn't get at Ayr. Mitchell was part of the club's successful promotion campaign in 2012, when having initially lost against Albion Rovers in the play-offs, Stranraer were promoted to the Scottish Second Division due to the demise of Rangers. During the 2014–15 season, Scottish Championship side Hibernian were reported to be interested in signing Mitchell.

In June 2015, Mitchell agreed a pre-contract with Dundee. He made his debut on 20 March 2016, in the Dundee derby against Dundee United, coming on as a substitute following a red card for Scott Bain. He left Dundee at the end of the 2016–17 season.

On 1 June 2017, Mitchell agreed a contract with Falkirk. On 24 May 2019, Mitchell signed for Clyde, on a one-year contract. He moved to Premiership club Hibernian in August 2021, and left them in June 2022 without having played a first-team game.

Career statistics

References

External links

1990 births
Living people
Footballers from Irvine, North Ayrshire
Scottish footballers
Association football goalkeepers
Ayr United F.C. players
Stranraer F.C. players
Dundee F.C. players
Falkirk F.C. players
Clyde F.C. players
Scottish Football League players
Scottish Professional Football League players
Hibernian F.C. players
Partick Thistle F.C. players